General elections were held in Honduras on 24 November 1985. Voters went to the polls to elect a new President of the Republic and a new Congress.

Results

References

Bibliography
Acker, Alison. Honduras: the making of a banana republic. Boston: South End Press. 1988.
Anderson, Thomas P.  Politics in Central America: Guatemala, El Salvador, Honduras, and Nicaragua.  New York: Praeger.  Revised edition. 1988.
Anderson, Thomas P. “Politics and the military in Honduras.”  Current history 87, 533:425+ (December 1988). 1988.
Barbieri, Leyda.  Honduran elections and democracy, withered by Washington: a report on past and present elections in Honduras, and an evaluation of the last five years of constitutional rule.  Washington: Washington Office on Latin America. 1986.
Bueso, Julio Antonio.  El subdesarrollo hondureño.  Tegucigalpa: Editorial Universitaria. 1987.
Delgado Fiallos, Anibal.  Honduras elecciones 85 (más allá de la fiesta cívica).  Tegucigalpa: Editorial Guaymuras. 1986.
Elections in the Americas A Data Handbook Volume 1. North America, Central America, and the Caribbean. Edited by Dieter Nohlen. 2005.
Fauriol, Georges A. and Eva Loser.  Honduran election study reports: the pre-election outlook.  Washington, D.C.: Center for Strategic & International Studies. 1985.
Lapper, Richard.  Honduras: state for sale.  London: Latin America Bureau. 1985.
Molina Chocano, Guillermo.  “Elecciones sin ganador?”  Nueva sociedad 82:2-8 (marzo-abril 1986). 1986.
Political handbook of the world 1985. New York, 1986.
Posas, Mario.  “El proceso de democratización en Honduras.”  Estudios sociales centroamericanos.  47:61-78 (mayo-agosto 1988). 1988.
Rosenberg, Mark B.  “Narcos and politicos:  the politics of drug trafficking in Honduras.”  Journal of interamerican studies and world affairs 30, 2/3:143-165 (summer-autumn 1988). 1988.
Rosenberg, Mark B.  “Can democracy survive the Democrats?  From transition to consolidation in Honduras.”  Booth, John A. and Mitchell A. Seligson, eds.  1989.  Elections and democracy in Central America.  Chapel Hill: The University of North Carolina Press. 1989.
Sullivan, Mark P.  “Government and politics.”  Merrill, Tim L., ed.  1995.  Honduras: a country study.  Washington, D.C.: Federal Research Division, Library of Congress. 1995.

Elections in Honduras
General
Honduras
Presidential elections in Honduras
Honduras